The 1974 Minnesota Golden Gophers football team represented the University of Minnesota in the 1974 Big Ten Conference football season. In their third year under head coach Cal Stoll, the Golden Gophers compiled a 4–7 record and were outscored by their opponents by a combined total of 332 to 161. 
 
Linebacker Ollie Bakken received the team's Most Valuable Player award. Tackle Keith Simons was named All-Big Ten first team.  Bakken and wide receiver Rick Upchurch were named All-Big Ten second team.

Total attendance for the season was 225,127, which averaged to 37,521. The season high for attendance was against rival Iowa.

Schedule

Roster

Season summary

Ohio State

Steve Goldberg broke his own school record for longest field goal in the first quarter.

References

Minnesota
Minnesota Golden Gophers football seasons
Minnesota Golden Gophers football